Abu Osama al-Tunisi is the name of:

 Abu Osama al-Tunisi (died 2007), suspected leader of al-Qaeda in Iraq, died 2007
 Abu Osama al-Tunisi (died 2016), ISIS militant and "emir" of Manbij, Syria, killed in the Manbij offensive (2016)